Farid Ahmed is an Independent politician and a former Jatiya Sangsad member representing the Gopalganj-2 constituency.

Career
Ahmed was elected to parliament from Gopalganj-2 as an independent candidate in 1988.

References

Living people
Bangladeshi politicians
4th Jatiya Sangsad members
Year of birth missing (living people)
Place of birth missing (living people)